The Nangarhar Leopards ( Da Nangarhār Pṛāngān) are a franchise cricket team which participates in the Afghanistan Premier League (APL). They joined the APL as one of its original members in 2018. The Australian all-rounder Ben Cutting was the captain for the inaugural session and Indian coach Venkatesh Prasad was appointed as the head coach of the team.

Current squad

 Tamim Iqbal and Mushfiqur Rahim did not participate in the tournament for having injuries while Mohammad Hafeez did not take part for international commitments.

Administration and Supporting staff
 Head Coach:  Venkatesh Prasad

References

Afghan domestic cricket competitions
Cricket clubs established in 2018
2018 in Afghan cricket
Afghanistan Premier League teams